The Jaynagar–Patna Intercity Express is an Intercity train belonging to East Central Railway zone that runs between  and  in India. It is currently being operated with 15549/15550 train numbers on a weekly basis.

Service

The 15549/Jayanagar Patna Intercity Express has an average speed of 29 km/hr and covers 244 km in 8h 30m. The 15550/Patna Jaynagar Intercity Express has an average speed of 32 km/hr and covers 244 km in 7h 30m.

Route and halts 

The important halts of the train are:

Coach composition

The train has standard ICF rakes with max speed of 110 kmph. The train consists of 11 coaches:

 1 AC Chair Car
 8 General Unreserved
 2 Seating cum Luggage Rake

Traction

Both trains are hauled by a Samastipur Loco Shed-based WDM-3A/WDM-3D diesel locomotive from Jainagar to Patna and vice versa.

Direction reversal

The train reverses its direction 1 times:

See also 

 Jaynagar railway station
 Jaynagar–Rajendra Nagar Terminal Intercity Express
 Patna Junction railway station

Notes

References

External links 

 15549/Jaynagar–Patna Intercity Express India Rail Info
 15550/Patna–Jaynagar Intercity Express India Rail Info

Transport in Jainagar
Transport in Patna
Intercity Express (Indian Railways) trains
Rail transport in Bihar
Railway services introduced in 2017